George Barrell Emerson (September 12, 1797 – March 14, 1881) was an American educator and pioneer of women's education.

Biography
He was born in Kennebunk, Maine. He graduated from Harvard College in 1817, and soon after took charge of an academy in Lancaster, Massachusetts. Between 1819 and 1821, he was the tutor in mathematics and natural philosophy at Harvard, and in 1821 was chosen principal of The English High School for Boys in Boston. In 1823 he opened the Emerson School for Girls in the same city, which he conducted until 1855, when he retired from professional life. He was for many years president of the Boston Society of Natural History, and was appointed by Governor Everett chairman of the commissioners for the zoological and botanical survey of Massachusetts. He died in Newton, Massachusetts.

Family
He was a cousin of Ralph Waldo Emerson.

Legacy
 Emerson Preparatory School in Washington, D.C. was named in his honor.

Further reading

Works by Emerson
 An address, delivered at the opening of the Boston Mechanics' Institution, February 7, 1827.
 The school and the schoolmaster. Part I by Alonzo Potter; Part II. by George Emerson. Boston: W.B. Fowle & N. Capen, 1843.
 Report on the Trees and Shrubs growing naturally in the Forests of Massachusetts (Boston, 1846)
 Manual of Agriculture (with C. Flint; 1861)
  “Education in Massachusetts: early legislation and history,” a lecture of a course by members of the Massachusetts Historical Society, delivered before the Lowell Institute, February 16, 1869.
 “What we owe to Louis Agassiz, as a teacher.” An address by George B. Emerson, before the Boston Society of Natural History, January 7, 1874.
 Reminiscences of an Old Teacher (1878)

Works about Emerson
 Biography at Harvard.edu - Biography and story of the founding of the Arnold Arboretum

Notes

References
 
 

1797 births
1881 deaths
American educators
Harvard University faculty
People from Boston
19th century in Boston
Harvard College alumni
People from Kennebunk, Maine